KBCY is a commercial radio station located in Tye, Texas, broadcasting to the Abilene, Texas area on 99.7 FM.  KBCY airs a country music format.

External links
KBCY official website

BCY
Country radio stations in the United States
Radio stations established in 1983
Cumulus Media radio stations
1983 establishments in Texas